A Good Recovery is a novel by Australian author Arthur Wright. It was originally serialised in 1924, in the Sydney newspaper, The World's News.

References

External links
A Good Recovery at AustLit
A Good Recovery at National Archives of Australia
Serialisation of novel in 1924 - 22 March, 29 March, 5 April, 12 April, 19 April, 26 April, 3 May, 10 May, 17 May, 24 May, 31 May, 7 June, 14 June

1928 Australian novels
Australian crime novels
Novels set in Sydney
Novels first published in serial form